In economics, the product market is the marketplace where final goods or services are sold to businesses and the public sector. Focusing on the sale of finished goods, it does not include trading in raw or other intermediate materials.

Related, but contrasting, terms are financial market and labour market.

Product market regulation is a term for the placing of restrictions upon the operation of the product market. According to an OECD ranking in 1998, English-speaking and Nordic countries had the least-regulated product markets in the OECD. The least-regulated product markets were to be found in:
United Kingdom
Australia
United States
Canada
New Zealand
Denmark
Ireland

According to the OECD, indicators for product market regulation include price controls, foreign ownership barriers, and tariffs, among other things.

See also
Factor market (economics)
Product marketing

References

External links

Goods (economics)